One Christmas: Chapter 1 is an extended play (EP) by American singer LeAnn Rimes. It was released on October 28, 2014 via the Iconic Entertainment Group and contained six tracks. The album was Rimes's second collection of Christmas music and second extended play released in her career. It received a positive response from AllMusic and later reached positions on the American Billboard charts.

Background and content
LeAnn Rimes first issued a Christmas project in 2004, which was titled What a Wonderful World. However, Rimes was looking forward to recording new holiday material. "I love it. I miss making Christmas music, so I’m happy," she told Billboard in 2014. The extended play was co-produced by Rimes, along with long-time collaborator Darrell Brown and Dave Audé. Rimes recorded the project at three separate studios: Blackbird Studios (located in Nashville, Tennessee), Capitol Recording Studios (located in Hollywood, California) and Surf Shack (also located in Hollywood). The extended play contained a total of six songs, each of which were favorites of Rimes. This included "Silent Night", "Christmas in Dixie" and "White Christmas". The latter recording was a family favorite, according to Rimes.

Release and reception

One Christmas: Chapter 1 was released on October 28, 2014 on Iconic Entertainment. It was Rimes's first release with the label and her second extended play issued in her career. It was offered as both a compact disc and to digital markets. The album received three out of five stars from Stephen Thomas Erlewine of AllMusic: "Generally, One Christmas does operate at a slow burn -- "Somebody at Christmas" and "Hard Candy Christmas" both simmer, with only "Carol of the Bells" sparkling perhaps a bit too much, providing a quickening tempo -- but Rimes' decision to play it cool in addition to having a bit of fun makes One Christmas a neat little seasonal treat," he commented. Dan MacIntosh of Country Standard Time gave it a mixed response: "As an album, One Christmas: Chapter 1 is about as creative as its title - which is not all that innovative. However, Rimes is a fantastic singer that sounds consistently wonderful throughout," he commented. 

On the Billboard 200, the EP reached number 172, spending only a week on the chart. It also spent eight weeks on the Top Country Albums chart, reaching number 20 in December 2014. It also reached number 35 on the Top Holiday Albums chart, spending two weeks there. "I Want a Hippopotamus for Christmas" was released as a single from the project in 2014, peaking at number 25 on the Billboard adult contemporary songs chart.

Track listing

Personnel 
All credits are adapted from the liner notes of One Christmas, Chapter 1 and AllMusic.

Musical personnel
 LeAnn Rimes – lead vocals, backing vocals 
 Matt Rollings – acoustic piano, Wurlitzer electric piano,Hammond B3  organ
 Dean Parks – guitars
 Tim Pierce – guitars
 Waddy Wachtel – guitars 
 Bob Glaub – bass
 Willie Weeks – bass
 Vinnie Colaiuta – drums, percussion 
 Steve Jordan – drums
 Darrell Brown – percussion, backing vocals (6)
 Eric Darken – percussion
 Jonathan Yudkin – strings
 Rob Dzibula – horns (2)
 Nick Lane – horns (2)
 Lee Thornburg – horns (2), arrangements (2)
 Troy "Trombone Shorty" Andrews – horns (4)
 Tim Davis – backing vocals (6)

Technical personnel
 LeAnn Rimes – producer, arrangements, quotation author
 Darrell Brown – producer, arrangements, additional recording 
 Dave Audé – producer (6), arrangements (6), mixing (6)
 Niko Bolas – recording, additional recording, mixing (1, 2, 3)
 Al Schmitt – mixing (1-5)
 Steve Genewick – additional recording, recording assistant, mix assistant 
 Chandler Harrod – additional recording, recording assistant, mix assistant 
 Ira Grylack – additional recording,
 Joe Napolitano – additional recording
 Lowell Reynolds – additional recording
 Ian Sefchick – mastering at Capitol Mastering (Hollywood, California)
 Paul Jamieson – technician
 Cindi Peters – production coordinator
 Brian O'Neil – product manager
 Ally Rodriguez – product manager
 Sara Hertel – photography
 Katie Moore – design

Chart performance

Release history

References

2014 EPs
Albums produced by Darrell Brown (musician)
Albums produced by LeAnn Rimes
Christmas EPs
LeAnn Rimes EPs